Ebeleben is a town in the Kyffhäuserkreis district, in Thuringia, Germany. It is situated 13 km southwest of Sondershausen. The former municipality Thüringenhausen was merged into Ebeleben in December 2019.

References

Kyffhäuserkreis
Schwarzburg-Sondershausen